Joseph Green Farmhouse is a historic home located at Duanesburg in Schenectady County, New York. It was built about 1857 and is a two-story, three bay frame dwelling with clapboard siding in a vernacular Greek Revival style. There is a one-story rear wing.  The house has a gable roof with prominent cornice returns and a wide frieze, and broad corner pilasters.  Also on the property are two contributing barns, a garage, and shed.

The property was covered in a 1984 study of Duanesburg historical resources.
It was listed on the National Register of Historic Places in 1984.

References

Houses on the National Register of Historic Places in New York (state)
Houses in Schenectady County, New York
Greek Revival houses in New York (state)
Houses completed in 1857
National Register of Historic Places in Schenectady County, New York
1857 establishments in New York (state)